Ervik is a village in Stad Municipality in Vestland county, Norway. The village sits at the southern base of the  mountain plateau, Kjerringa which forms a cliff that plunges almost vertically into the ocean at the northwestern end of the peninsula. It is one of the westernmost villages in mainland Norway.

Ervik Church is located in the village. There is a memorial at the church for the people who died when  was bombed by Allied aircraft and sank off the coast of Ervik.

The village has a grocery store, kindergarten, and small school. The residents of Ervik work mostly with fishing and farming (mostly cattle, sheep, and goat farming). There is also a large beach area in the small bay along the coast of Ervik.

References

Stad, Norway
Villages in Vestland